Clavulina craterelloides is a species of coral fungus in the family Clavulinaceae. Known only from Guyana, it was described in 2004. The fruit bodies are large, orange-brown in color, and funnel-shaped, occurring in groves of Dicymbe trees.

References

External links

Fungi described in 2004
Fungi of Guyana
craterelloides